Capillary Technologies is a software product company, which provides cloud-based Omnichannel Customer Engagement, eCommerce platform and related services for retailers and brands. It is headquartered in Singapore.

History
Capillary Technologies was founded by Aneesh Reddy, Krishna Mehra, and Ajay Modani in 2008. The co-founders are graduates of Indian Institute of Technology, Kharagpur (IIT-KGP). Before founding Capillary, Aneesh worked at ITC Limited; Krishna at Microsoft Research; Ajay at Danieli.

Incubated in IIT Kharagpur, Capillary began its operations in Bangalore in August 2008.

In June 2013 Harvard Business Review used Capillary as a Case for reverse Innovation in Tech Startups.

In July 2016, Capillary expanded its operations to retailers in China

In December 2016, Google's Vice President for South East Asia and India, Rajan Anandan joined Capillary as a board member.

In September 2019, the company signed a partnership pact with Veda Holding, a company based in Saudi Arabia to form Capillary Arabia.

Funding
 2008: Capillary was incubated at Entrepreneurship Cell, IIT Kharagpur.
 2009: $100,000 from QPrize Business Plan Competition by Qualcomm.
 Sep 2012: $15.5 million from Sequoia Capital, Norwest Venture Partners & Qualcomm.
 Feb 2014: $4 Million from American Express in February 2014.
 Sep 2015: $45 Million from Warburg Pincus, Sequoia Capital and Norwest Venture Partners.

Acquisitions
In September 2015, Capillary acquired an eCommerce software platform MartJack.

In October 2016, Capillary acquired SellerWorx, an eCommerce services and technology company.

References

External links

Technology companies of India
Software companies established in 2008
Customer relationship management software
Customer loyalty programs
Companies based in Bangalore
Software companies of Singapore
2008 establishments in Karnataka
Privately held companies of India